The Rund um Köln is a classic cycling race around the German city of Cologne. Since 2005 it is  part of the UCI Europe Tour, being organised as 1.1 race (in 2007 the race was categorised as 1.HC). It is one of the oldest cycling races still running in Germany – where media-driven hostility towards professional cycling in the wake of repeated doping scandals has severely weakened the economic structure and viability of the sport. The Rund um Köln is the second-oldest race in Germany, just after Rund um die Hainleite, which was first held in 1908. Between the 1930s and late 1980s Rund um Köln was held as an amateur race. The race was contested every year on Easter Monday from 2000 to 2014. From 2015 until 2019 it was contested on the second Sunday in June.

The centenary edition of the Rund um Köln, set for March 24, 2008, was cancelled due to snow.  The 2009 edition was contested by a weakened, sub-par field, as top professional teams did not send their stars, and the riders raced for their country instead.

Winners

References

External links

UCI Europe Tour races
Cycle races in Germany
Recurring sporting events established in 1908
1908 establishments in Germany
Sport in Cologne